Syed Muhammad Sabir Shah or more commonly as Pir Sabir Shah is a politician from the Khyber-Pakhtunkhwa province of Pakistan. He served as the 18th Chief Minister of the province from 20 October 1993 to 25 February 1994. He was an advisor to the Prime Minister of Pakistan Nawaz Sharif from 1997 to 1999. He currently serves as a Senator from Khyber Pakhtunkhwa.

Family
Pir Sabir Shah hails from a religious family of Syeds settled in Sirikot in Haripur. He belongs to the Mashwani tribe. They are linked to the Qadiri Sufi order. His lineage is traced to Ali in 43 chains through Syed Muhammad Masood and Gesudaraz I.

Education

Pir Sabir Shah studied at a school in Sirikit. He completed his bachelor's degree from Government College, Abbottabad, then earned a bachelor of Arts degree from University of Peshawar of Arts degree from the University of Peshawar. He earned a master's degree in Islamic studies after graduation. He then enrolled at the Institute of Modern Languages in Islamabad and obtained a four-year degree in Arabic language and Islamic studies. He then enrolled at the International Islamic University for higher studies and successfully completed higher studies in Daura and Fiqh.

Political career

Pir Sabir Shah contested the 1985 elections and won as an independent candidate. He was asked by the Muslim League to join them. A grand jirga was called at Shatalo Shareef, Sirikit. They agreed to let him join the Pakistan Muslim League. He won elections in 1988, 1990, 1993 , and 1997 contesting from his constituency PF-43 (Provincial Frontier −43) of Haripur.

He served as the 18th Chief Minister of the province from 20 October 1993 to 25 February 1994. He is currently serving as the chairman of the Senate Standing Committee on Water Resources.

References

Pashtun people
Pakistan Muslim League (N) politicians
Chief Ministers of Khyber Pakhtunkhwa
People from Haripur District
1955 births
Living people
University of Peshawar alumni
Members of the Senate of Pakistan